The Hutt Valley (or 'The Hutt') is the large area of fairly flat land in the Hutt River valley in the Wellington region of New Zealand. Like the river that flows through it, it takes its name from Sir William Hutt, a director of the New Zealand Company in early colonial New Zealand.

The river flows roughly along the course of an active geologic fault, which continues to the south to become the main instrument responsible for the uplift of the South Island's Southern Alps / Kā Tiritiri o te Moana. For this reason, the land rises abruptly to the west of the river; to the east two floodplains have developed. Beyond this, the river is briefly confined by a steep-sided gorge near Taitā, before the land opens up into a long triangular plain close to the outflow into Wellington Harbour.

Human settlement
The lower valley contains the city of Lower Hutt, administered by Hutt City Council, while the adjacent, larger but less populous city of Upper Hutt has its centre on the smaller plain above the Taita Gorge.  The valley forms a major dormitory suburban area for Wellington, and is a location for manufacturing and heavy industry, educational and recreational facilities, and the region's motor camps.

Petone, on the Wellington Harbour shoreline, was proposed as the initial site for the settlement of Wellington by the New Zealand Company.  However, as the chosen site was soon seen to be prone to river flooding, early settlement was relocated to Wellington.  A small settlement remained at the Petone site as the whole valley was believed to be well suited as farm land.

In 1846 there was fighting between Māori tribes and the Government, known as the Hutt Valley Campaign.

Almost the whole valley was clearfelled and converted to pasture or market gardens before the urbanisation of the 20th century.  A small remnant of the early podocarp forest is preserved in Barton's Bush in Upper Hutt.

External links 

 Hutt City Council (Lower Hutt area)
 Upper Hutt City Council (Upper Hutt area)
 HuttValleyNZ.com (tourism information)
 

Valleys of the Wellington Region